The Asian Water Polo Cup is an international water polo tournament, organized by Asia Swimming Federation (AASF).

Summaries

Men

Women

Participating nations

Men

Women

See also
 Water polo at the Asian Games
 Asian Swimming Championships
 Asian Water Polo Championship

References

International water polo competitions
Recurring sporting events established in 2010
Cup